2 Chronicles 31 is the thirty-first chapter of the Second Book of Chronicles the Old Testament in the Christian Bible or of the second part of the Books of Chronicles in the Hebrew Bible. The book is compiled from older sources by an unknown person or group, designated by modern scholars as "the Chronicler", and had the final shape established in late fifth or fourth century BCE. This chapter belongs to the section focusing on the kingdom of Judah until its destruction by the Babylonians under Nebuchadnezzar and the beginning of restoration under Cyrus the Great of Persia  (2 Chronicles 10 to 36). The focus of this chapter is the reign of Hezekiah, king of Judah.

Text
This chapter was originally written in the Hebrew language and is divided into 21 verses.

Textual witnesses
Some early manuscripts containing the text of this chapter in Hebrew are of the Masoretic Text tradition, which includes the Codex Leningradensis (1008).

There is also a translation into Koine Greek known as the Septuagint, made in the last few centuries BCE. Extant ancient manuscripts of the Septuagint version include Codex Vaticanus (B; B; 4th century), and Codex Alexandrinus (A; A; 5th century).

The reform of Hezekiah (31:1–10)

Verse 1 parallels to 2 Kings 18:4 summarizing Hezekiah's reforming measures. Once the temple service was reinstalled, Hezekiah reinstated the priestly and Levitical divisions as set out by David (1 Chronicles 23–26; 1 Chronicles 28:13, 21) and implemented by Solomon (cf. 2 Chronicles 8:14; 23:18–19), then Hezekiah organized the tithes. The king also contributed to the support of the Temple and its workers, like David did (1 Chronicles 22:14–16; 29:2–5), and likewise responded by the people with their generosity (cf. 1 Chronicles 29:6–9). The chief priest in Hezekiah's time was Azariah, which has the same name of the chief priest under Solomon, both from the lineage of Zadok, portraying Hezekiah in similar light to David and Solomon although their names were not explicitly mentioned in this chapter.

Verse 7
 In the third month they began to lay the foundation of the heaps, and finished them in the seventh month.
"The third month" (Sivan; usually May–June) is the month of the grain harvest and at the same time the month of the harvest festival (called "Shavuot", "Feast of weeks", "Feast of Harvest", "Feast of Firstfruits" or "Pentecost"), which fell about the sixth day of the month when the tithe in kind would be paid. 
"The seventh month" (Tishrei; usually September to October): is the period of vine and fruit harvesting and the celebration of the Feast of Ingathering ("Sukkot" or "Feast of Tabernacles").

Hezekiah organizes the priests (31:11–21)
The abundance of tithes needed to stored so king Hezekiah ordered to build or renovate more chambers for the purpose. Two Levites (Cononiah and Shimei) administered "the offerings and the tithes and the dedicated things", with the assistance of ten 'overseers' (Jehiel, Azaziah, Nahath, Asahel, Jerimoth, Jozabad, Eliel, Ismachiah, Mahath, and Benaiah), leading to the 'round sum of twelve' (verses 11–13). Verses 14–19 detail the distribution of the offerings as the financial support for the priests and Levites on the basis of the number and size of the family (cf. ), both in Jerusalem and in the other cities.

Verse 19
Also of the sons of Aaron the priests, which were in the fields of the suburbs of their cities, in every several city, the men that were expressed by name, to give portions to all the males among the priests, and to all that were reckoned by genealogies among the Levites.
 "The fields of the suburbs of their cities": see ; 
 "Expressed by name": meaning that 'all priests and Levites of full age were sacredly remembered and similarly carefully provided'; see ;

See also

Related Bible parts: Leviticus 25, Numbers 35, 2 Kings 18,  2 Chronicles 29,  2 Chronicles 30

Notes

References

Sources

External links
 Jewish translations:
 Divrei Hayamim II - II Chronicles - Chapter 31 (Judaica Press) in Hebrew and English translation [with Rashi's commentary] at Chabad.org
 Christian translations:
 Online Bible at GospelHall.org (ESV, KJV, Darby, American Standard Version, Bible in Basic English)
 2 Chronicles Chapter 31. Bible Gateway

31